The shooting competitions at the 2018 Mediterranean Games in Tarragona took place on 23 and 24 June at the Sant Salvador Pavilion and the Shooting Range Jordi Tarragó.

Athletes competed in 6 events.

Medal summary

Men's events

Women's events

Medal table

References

External links
2018 Mediterranean Games – Shooting

Sports at the 2018 Mediterranean Games
2018
Mediterranean Games